Is It Alive is a live album by punk rock band Bodyjar. The album was recorded from a live performance at the Annandale Hotel in Sydney while the band were on their "Call To Arms tour", named after their third song on their self-titled album from 2005 (Bodyjar).

The live show used for this album was originally recorded unbeknownst to the band as lead singer Cameron Baines describes, "We've always wanted to do a live album and by chance someone recorded the band in Sydney with out us even realizing."

The album cover for Is It Alive contains a water-pipe (or "bong"), alluding to the fact that the members of Bodyjar are recreational users of cannabis.

Reviews 
Matt Thrower from Rave magazine reviewed the album giving it a positive 3 out of 5 stars.

Track listing
This is the track listing as printed on the disc.

Personnel

Musicians
 Cameron Baines - vocals, guitar
 Tom Read - guitar, vocals
 Grant Relf - bass guitar, vocals
 Shane Wakker - drums

Technical
 Mixed by Kalju Tonuma at 101 Collingwood
 Recorded at the Annandale Hotel Sydney by Live Cast Production Studios, Sydney
 Mastered by Dave Walker

References

Bodyjar albums
Live albums by Australian artists